The 2013 Air Force Falcons football team represented the United States Air Force Academy in the 2013 NCAA Division I FBS football season. The Falcons were led by seventh-year head coach Troy Calhoun and played their home games at Falcon Stadium. They were a member of the Mountain West Conference in the Mountain Division. They finished the season 2–10, 0–8 in Mountain West play to finish in last place in the Mountain Division.

Schedule

Game summaries

Colgate

Utah State

at Boise State

Wyoming

at Nevada

at Navy

San Diego State

Notre Dame

Army

at New Mexico

UNLV

at Colorado State

References

Air Force
Air Force Falcons football seasons
Air Force Falcons football